The 1960 Cleveland Browns season was the team's 11th season with the National Football League. The 1960 Browns compiled an 8–3–1 record, and finished second in the NFL's Eastern Conference, behind the NFL champion Philadelphia Eagles. As runner-up, the Browns qualified for the inaugural third place Playoff Bowl in Miami, but lost 17–16 to the Detroit Lions on January 7.

Personnel

Roster

Staff/coaches

Preseason

Pre Season Game Officials

Game summaries

Week P1 (Saturday, August 13, 1960): at Detroit Lions

 Time of Game:

Week P2 (Thursday, August 18, 1960): at Pittsburgh Steelers

Week P3 (Saturday, August 27, 1960): at Los Angeles Rams

Week P4 (Saturday, September 3, 1960): vs. San Francisco 49ers

Week P5 (Saturday, September 10, 1960): vs. Chicago Bears

Week P6 (Saturday, September 17, 1960): vs. Detroit Lions

Regular season

Schedule

Note: Intra-conference opponents are in bold text.

Regular Season Game Officials

Game summaries

Week 1 (Sunday, September 25, 1960): at Philadelphia Eagles

 Time of Game:

Week 2 (Sunday, October 2, 1960): vs. Pittsburgh Steelers

 Time of Game:

Week 4 (Sunday, October 16, 1960): at Dallas Cowboys

Week 5 (Sunday, October 23, 1960): vs. Philadelphia Eagles

Week 6 (Sunday, October 30, 1960): at Washington Redskins

Week 7 (Sunday, November 6, 1960): vs. New York Giants

Week 8 (Sunday, November 13, 1960): vs. St. Louis Cardinals

Week 9 (Sunday, November 20, 1960): at Pittsburgh Steelers

Week 10 (Sunday, November 27, 1960): at St. Louis Cardinals

Week 11 (Sunday, December 4, 1960): vs. Washington Redskins

Week 12 (Sunday, December 11, 1960): vs. Chicago Bears

Week 13 (Sunday, December 18, 1960): at New York Giants

Standings

Final statistics

Statistical comparison

Boxscore

Individual leaders
Offense

Defense

Special teams

Postseason

Playoff Game Officials

Game summaries

NFL Playoff Bowl (Sunday, January 7, 1961): vs. Detroit Lions

Awards and records
 Jim Brown, NFL rushing leader, 1,257 yards
 Milt Plum, NFL leader, passing yards, (2,297)

Milestones
 Jim Brown, third consecutive 1,000 yard season
 Jim Brown, fourth consecutive rushing title

References

External links 
 1960 Cleveland Browns Statistics at jt-sw.com
 1960 Cleveland Browns Schedule at jt-sw.com
 1960 Cleveland Browns at DatabaseFootball.com  

Cleveland
Cleveland Browns seasons
Cleveland Browns